The All of Mexico Movement, or All Mexico Movement, was a political movement to expand the United States to include all of Mexico. It was an expression of Manifest Destiny but never went into effect. The Mexican–American War (1846–1848) brought the conquest of California and other sparsely settled territories in northern Mexico, and American troops also invaded the densely populated Mexican heartland.

After the US Army took Mexico City, there was renewed enthusiasm for incorporating all of Mexico. The idea was fiercely opposed in the US Congress, especially by a US senator from South Carolina, John C. Calhoun, who strongly objected to incorporating territory with a dense nonwhite population.

The Treaty of Guadalupe Hidalgo ended the aspirations of the movement by acquiring the sparsely settled region in the far north of Mexico.

Background

Before US President James K. Polk took office in 1845, the US Congress approved the annexation of Texas. Polk wished to gain control of a portion of Texas, which had declared independence from Mexico in 1836, but it was still claimed by Mexico. That paved the way for the outbreak of the Mexican–American War on April 24, 1846.

American success on the battlefield by the summer of 1847 encouraged calls for the annexation of all of Mexico, particularly by eastern Democrats, who argued that bringing Mexico into the Union would be the best way to ensure peace in the region.

Opposition

The proposal to annex all of Mexico was controversial. Idealistic advocates of Manifest Destiny, such as John L. O'Sullivan, had always maintained that the laws of the United States should not be imposed onto people against their will. The annexation of all of Mexico would violate that principle and find controversy by extending US citizenship to millions of Mexicans.

That debate brought to the forefront one of the contradictions of Manifest Destiny. Identitarian ideas inherent in Manifest Destiny suggested that Mexicans, as nonwhites, would present a threat to white racial integrity and so were not qualified to become US citizens, but the "mission" component of Manifest Destiny suggested that Mexicans would be improved (or "regenerated," as it was then described) by bringing them into American democracy. Identitarianism promoted Manifest Destiny, but, as in the case of Calhoun and the resistance to the movement, identitarianism was also used to oppose Manifest Destiny.

Supporters of total annexation of "All Mexico" regarded it as an anti-slavery measure. Many Americans were troubled by Mexico's Catholicism, weak republicanism, and threat of an upsurge in nationalism.

Failure

The controversy was eventually ended by the Mexican Cession, which added the territories of Alta California and Nuevo México to the United States, both more sparsely populated than the rest of Mexico. Like the All of Oregon movement, the All of Mexico movement quickly abated. 

The historian Frederick Merk, in Manifest Destiny and Mission in American History: A Reinterpretation (1963), argued that the failure of the All of Oregon and All of Mexico movements indicates that manifest destiny had not been as popular as historians have traditionally portrayed it to have been. Merk wrote that belief in the beneficent mission of democracy was central to American history, but aggressive "continentalism" was an aberration supported by only a minority of Americans, mostly Democrats, but opposed by Whigs and some Democrats. Thus, Louisiana Democrats opposed the annexation of Mexico, while those in Mississippi supported it.

See also

Golden Circle

References

Further reading

Fuller, John Douglas Pitts. The Movement for the Acquisition of All Mexico, 1846-1848.  Baltimore 1936.
Lambert, Paul F. "The Movement for the Acquisition of All Mexico." Journal of the West XI (April 1972) pp. 317-27.

History of United States expansionism
1840s in the United States
1840s in Mexico
Expansion of slavery in the United States
Mexican–American War